The football tournament at the 1986 Spartakiad of Peoples of the USSR was a preparatory competition for the Soviet Union Olympic football team among the Olympic reserves. The competition took place on July 9 through July 27, 1986 as part of the Spartakiad of Peoples of the USSR.

The competition included footballers under 21 years of age (born between 1965 and 1968). All participating teams at first were split in four groups with top two team in each of them advancing to the next round forming two semifinal groups of four in each. Depending on their standing in their groups, teams would play off with another team that placed the same place in another group.

Competition

Preliminary games
All times local (UTC+3)

Group 1 (Nikopol and Ordzhonikidze)

{| class=wikitable style="text-align:center"
|-
!width="165"|Team
!width="20"|
!width="20"|
!width="20"|
!width="20"|
!width="20"|
!width="20"|
!width="20"|
!width="20"|
|- style="background:#cfc"
|align=left| RSFSR
|4||4||0||0||14||2||+12||8
|- style="background:#cfc"
|align=left| Leningrad
|4||2||1||1||7||2||+5||5
|- 
|align=left| Estonia
|4||2||1||1||7||8||−1||5
|- 
|align=left| Armenia
|4||1||0||3||3||6||-3||2
|- 
|align=left| Kyrgyzia
|4||0||0||4||2||15||-13||0
|}

Leningrad finished second ahead of Estonia based on their goal difference.

Group 2 (Zaporizhia)
{| class=wikitable style="text-align:center"
|-
!width="165"|Team
!width="20"|
!width="20"|
!width="20"|
!width="20"|
!width="20"|
!width="20"|
!width="20"|
!width="20"|
|- style="background:#cfc"
|align=left| Moscow
|3||1||2||0||8||0||+8||4
|- style="background:#cfc"
|align=left| Kazakhstan
|3||1||2||0||6||2||+4||4
|- 
|align=left| Georgia
|3||0||3||0||3||3||0||3
|- 
|align=left| Tajikistan
|3||0||1||2||3||15||-12||1
|}

Moscow finished first ahead of Kazakhstan based on their goal difference.

Group 3 (Donetsk)
{| class=wikitable style="text-align:center"
|-
!width="165"|Team
!width="20"|
!width="20"|
!width="20"|
!width="20"|
!width="20"|
!width="20"|
!width="20"|
!width="20"|
|- style="background:#cfc"
|align=left| Ukraine
|3||3||0||0||4||1||+3||6
|- style="background:#cfc"
|align=left| Uzbekistan
|3||1||1||1||7||4||+3||3
|- 
|align=left| Belorussia
|3||1||0||2||4||8||−4||2
|- 
|align=left| Azerbaijan
|3||0||1||2||1||3||-2||1
|}

Group 4 (Kharkiv)
{| class=wikitable style="text-align:center"
|-
!width="165"|Team
!width="20"|
!width="20"|
!width="20"|
!width="20"|
!width="20"|
!width="20"|
!width="20"|
!width="20"|
|- style="background:#cfc"
|align=left| Latvia
|3||2||0||1||4||4||0||4
|- style="background:#cfc"
|align=left| Moldavia
|3||1||1||1||4||2||+2||3
|- 
|align=left| Lithuania
|3||1||1||1||2||2||0||3
|- 
|align=left| Turkmenia
|3||1||0||2||1||4||-3||2
|}

Moldavia finished second ahead of Lithuania based on their goal difference.

Semifinals groups
Group A (Nikopol and Ordzhonikidze)
{| class=wikitable style="text-align:center"
|-
!width="165"|Team
!width="20"|
!width="20"|
!width="20"|
!width="20"|
!width="20"|
!width="20"|
!width="20"|
!width="20"|
|- style="background:#cfc"
|align=left| Ukraine
|3||3||0||0||10||2||+8||6
|- 
|align=left| Moldavia
|3||2||0||1||4||2||+2||4
|- 
|align=left| RSFSR
|3||1||0||2||4||2||+2||2
|- 
|align=left| Kazakhstan
|3||0||0||3||2||14||-12||0
|}

Group B (Zaporizhia)
{| class=wikitable style="text-align:center"
|-
!width="165"|Team
!width="20"|
!width="20"|
!width="20"|
!width="20"|
!width="20"|
!width="20"|
!width="20"|
!width="20"|
|- style="background:#cfc"
|align=left| Uzbekistan
|3||2||1||0||7||0||+7||5
|- 
|align=left| Moscow
|3||1||2||0||8||1||+7||4
|- 
|align=left| Latvia
|3||1||0||2||3||14||−11||2
|- 
|align=left| Leningrad
|3||0||1||2||2||5||-3||1
|}

Final playoffs
 7th place playoff (Nikopol). Leningrad – Kazakh SSR 2:0
 5th place playoff (Ordzhonikidze). RSFSR – Latvian SSR 5:2
 3rd place playoff (Kiev). Moscow – Moldavian SSR 3:1
 1st place playoff (Kiev). Ukraine – Uzbek SSR 1:0

1986 Champions – Ukrainian SSR
 Head coach – Viktor Kolotov, assistant coaches – Volodymyr Troshkin, Yevhen Kotelnykov
 Andriy Kovtun (SKA Kiev), Volodymyr Tsytkin (Dynamo Irpin), Volodymyr Horilyi (Dynamo Kyiv), Serhiy Shmatovalenko (SKA Odessa), Oleh Derevinsky (Dynamo Kyiv), A.Dyuldyn, A.Enei, R.Kolokolov, Oleksandr Nefyodov, Oleksandr Rolevych (SKA Odessa), Serhiy Kovalets (Zirka Berdychiv), Syarhey Herasimets (Shakhtar Donetsk), Oleksandr Yesipov (Metalist Kharkiv), Oleksandr Ivanov (Metalist Kharkiv), S.Khudozhylov, A.Mareyev, V.Marchuk, Oleksandr Hushchyn, Andriy Sydelnykov (Dynamo Kyiv), Vasyl Storchak (Torpedo Lutsk), O.Serdyuk

Further reading
 Football-87: Handbook-calendar / compiled by N.Kiselyov — "Lenizdat", 1987
 Football-87: Handbook-calendar — Moscow: Luzhniki, 1987.
 "Football-Hockey". № 31, 3 August 1986

External links
 1986 Spartakiad of Peoples of the USSR at the Luhansk Our Football portal
 Football at Spartakiads of Peoples of the USSR. 1986 (Футбол на Спартакиадах народов СССР. 1986 год). Russian Association of Mini-Football.

1986
Spartakiad of Peoples of the USSR
Spartakiad of Peoples of the USSR

International association football competitions hosted by Ukraine
Youth football in Ukraine